The Merit Medal in Bronze, post-nominal letters MMB, was instituted by the President of the Republic of South Africa in April 1996. It was awarded to veteran cadres of Umkhonto we Sizwe, the military wing of the African National Congress, who had distinguished themselves during the "struggle" by service of a high order.

Umkhonto we Sizwe
Umkhonto we Sizwe, abbreviated as MK, "Spear of the Nation" in Zulu, was the para-military wing of the African National Congress (ANC). It was established on 16 December 1961 to wage an armed "struggle" against the Nationalist government inside South Africa. On 27 April 1994, Umkhonto we Sizwe was amalgamated with six other military forces into the South African National Defence Force (SANDF).

Institution
The Merit Medal in Bronze, post-nominal letters MMB, was instituted by the President of South Africa in April 1996. It is the junior award of a set of three decorations for merit, along with the Decoration for Merit in Gold and the Merit Medal in Silver.

Umkhonto we Sizwe's military decorations and medals were modelled on those of the South African Defence Force and these three decorations are the approximate equivalents of, respectively, the Southern Cross Decoration and Pro Merito Decoration, the Southern Cross Medal (1975) and Pro Merito Medal (1975), and the Military Merit Medal.

Award criteria
The decoration could be awarded to veteran cadres of Umkhonto we Sizwe who had distinguished themselves during the "struggle" by service of a high order.

Order of wear

The position of the Merit Medal in Bronze in the official military and national orders of precedence was revised upon the institution of a new set of honours on 27 April 2003.

Umkhonto we Sizwe
  
Official MK order of precedence:
 Preceded by the Merit Medal in Silver (MMS).
 Succeeded by the Operational Medal for Southern Africa.

South African National Defence Force until 26 April 2003
  
Official SANDF order of precedence:
 Preceded by the Bronze Medal for Merit (BMM) of the Azanian People's Liberation Army.
 Succeeded by the Chief C.D.F. Commendation Medal of the Republic of Ciskei.
Official national order of precedence:
 Preceded by the Bronze Medal for Merit (BMM) of the Azanian People's Liberation Army.
 Succeeded by the Chief C.D.F. Commendation Medal of the Republic of Ciskei.

South African National Defence Force from 27 April 2003
  
Official SANDF order of precedence:
 Preceded by the Bronze Medal for Merit (BMM) of the Azanian People's Liberation Army.
 Succeeded by the iPhrothiya yeBhronzi (PB) of the Republic of South Africa.
Official national order of precedence:
 Preceded by the Bronze Medal for Merit (BMM) of the Azanian People's Liberation Army.
 Succeeded by the iPhrothiya yeBhronzi (PB) of the Republic of South Africa.

Description
Obverse
The Merit Medal in Bronze was struck in bronze and has an engrailed edge which has nine points, to fit in a circle 38 millimetres in diameter. It depicts the Umkhonto we Sizwe emblem and a protea flower in each of the nine points.

Ribbon
The ribbon is 32 millimetres wide and dark blue, with a 12 millimetres wide dark yellow band in the centre.

Discontinuation
Conferment of the Merit Medal in Bronze was discontinued upon the institution of a new set of honours on 27 April 2003.

References

Military decorations and medals of uMkhonto we Sizwe
1996 establishments in South Africa
Awards established in 1996